Pavle Radovanović (Serbian Cyrillic: Павле Радовановић; born 21 August 1975) is a Montenegrin international referee who refereed at 2014 FIFA World Cup qualifiers.

References

1975 births
Living people
Montenegrin football referees